Taj Ultimate is an annual Ultimate tournament that occurs in the Tajima region of Hyōgo Prefecture, Japan. The tournament was started by a group of JET English teachers to foster a better relationship between the JETs and the local Japanese.

Taj Ultimate (Year Wise) 

 The first Taj Ultimate tournament took place on June 5–6, 2004 at the Taj Dome. The winners were Tokyo Frisbee team The Small Axe.
 Taj 2005 took place from July 9–10, and was won by the Kinki Trolls.
 The next tournament took place from July 1–2, 2006, where the new all-Japanese team Osaka Natto took first place.
The 4th annual tournament was played during a typhoon on July 14–15, 2007, where the Japanese team Kuroshio came first.
The 5th annual tournament was held July 12–13, 2008. Japanese team Nanman Dive won the championship game.
The 6th annual tournament will be held July 11–12, 2009.

External link 
 Taj Ultimate Home Page

Ultimate (sport) competitions